Alexis Ann Crooke is an Australian former professional tennis player.

Crooke, a native of Queensland, won the girls' singles title at the 1967 Australian Championships, under her maiden name Lexie Kenny. She was a women's doubles quarter-finalist at the 1969 Australian Open. In 1970 she competed in the women's singles main draws of both the French Open and Wimbledon. Her husband, Ken Crooke, is a former director of the  Queensland National Party.

References

External links
 
 

Year of birth missing (living people)
Living people
Australian female tennis players
Australian Championships (tennis) junior champions
Grand Slam (tennis) champions in girls' singles
Tennis people from Queensland